Taylor Bayou is a bayou in Jefferson County, Texas. It is formed by the confluence of the North Fork and the South Fork. Mayhaw Bayou flows into the South Fork. The headwaters of these streams are in western Jefferson County. La Belle and Taylor Landing are small settlements near Taylor Bayou.

The bayou flows east. Near Port Arthur, it is joined by the left tributaries Hillebrandt Bayou and Alligator Bayou. There, is directed by canals into the Intracoastal Waterway, southwest of the Port of Port Arthur on Sabine Lake.

See also
List of rivers of Texas

References

USGS Geographic Names Information Service
USGS Hydrologic Unit Map - State of Texas (1974)

Rivers of Texas
Rivers of Jefferson County, Texas